"Old Habits Die Hard" is a song from the 2004 movie Alfie, with music by David Stewart and lyrics by Mick Jagger, and performed by Jagger. It won the 2005 Golden Globe Award for Best Original Song. However, the song failed to get nominated for the Academy Award for Best Original Song, making it the first in five consecutive years where the song that won the Golden Globe was not nominated for an Oscar.

Two versions of "Old Habits Die Hard" are available in the Alfie soundtrack: One performed by Mick Jagger alone, and second version featuring Sheryl Crow. The song also features backing vocals by then-unknown pop singer Katy Perry.

References

External links
 USA Today
 Billboard

2004 songs
Mick Jagger songs
Best Original Song Golden Globe winning songs
Songs written by David A. Stewart
Songs written by Mick Jagger